Salty O'Rourke is a 1945 American drama film directed by Raoul Walsh and starring Alan Ladd and Gail Russell. It was nominated for an Academy Award in 1946.

Plot
In New Orleans, racetrack gambler Salty O'Rourke is pursued by gangster Doc Baxter, after Salty's partner runs off with Baxter's $20,000 and is murdered. O'Rourke and his pal Smitty have one month to pay up.

Salty buys a race horse, Whipper, who can only be ridden by Johnny Cates, a jockey disbarred for throwing a race. Johnny pretends to be his 17-year-old brother Timothy, but is forced to attend school.

Johnny insults his teacher, Barbara Brooks, on his first day and is expelled. Salty gets Johnny back in school by befriending Barbara and her mother.

Both Johnny and Salty fall in love with Barbara but she prefers Salty. This causes Johnny to swear vengeance against Salty. He decides to throw the race but changes his mind and is shot by Baxter's henchman.

Cast 
 Alan Ladd as Salty O'Rourke
 Gail Russell as Barbara Brooks
 William Demarest as Smitty
 Stanley Clements as Johnny Cates
 Bruce Cabot as Doc Baxter
 David Clyde as Square MacPherson

Production
Milton Holmes wrote the original story. It envisioned as a vehicle for Clark Gable, Rosalind Russell and Mickey Rooney. When Gable went off to the services the film rights were purchased by Paramount in 1942 for $28,000 who developed it as a vehicle for George Raft.

The film eventually became a vehicle for Alan Ladd. Production plans were delayed when Ladd went into the army but were reactivated when he was honorably discharged in October 1943. Ladd's costar in Lucky Jordan, Helen Walker, was originally announced as co star. Adrian Scott was brought on to work on the script and René Clair to direct. Irving Cummings was then meant to direct.

Eventually Gail Russell became Ladd's co star and Raoul Walsh the director. Stanley Clements was cast in the third lead after impressing in Going My Way.

Filming plans were interrupted when Alan Ladd was reclassified 1A and would have to be re-inducted into the army. Paramount got a deferment to enable him to make Two Years Before the Mast and tried to get one to make Salty O'Rourke as well. They succeeded and filming started in late August 1944.

References

External links 
 
 
Review of film at New York Times
Review of film at Variety
Radio adaptation of Salty O'Rourke for Lux Radio Theatre
 

1945 films
Films directed by Raoul Walsh
Paramount Pictures films
1940s English-language films
American drama films
1945 drama films
American black-and-white films
Films scored by Robert Emmett Dolan
Films set in New Orleans
Films about gambling
American horse racing films
1940s American films